Keith Murray (born 23 May 1962) is a former Scotland international rugby union player.

Rugby Union career

Amateur career

He played for Hawick Trades, before moving to play for Hawick.

Provincial career

He played for South of Scotland District.

International career

He was capped twice for Scotland 'B', the first cap against Ireland 'B' on 1 December 1984.

He played for Scotland. He was capped three times in 1985.

References

1962 births
Living people
Hawick Trades players
Rugby union players from Hawick
Scotland international rugby union players
Scottish rugby union players
Hawick RFC players
Scotland 'B' international rugby union players
South of Scotland District (rugby union) players